The Music of Nashville: Season 3, Volume 2 is the sixth soundtrack album for the American musical drama television series Nashville, created by Academy Award winner Callie Khouri and starring Connie Britton as country music superstar Rayna Jaymes and Hayden Panettiere as new star Juliette Barnes. The album was released digitally and (exclusive to Target stores in North America) physically on May 12, 2015 through Big Machine Records.

Although guest star Christina Aguilera's songs "The Real Thing" and "Shotgun" were released as digital singles, neither track appears on the album due to label rights (Aguilera is an RCA artist).

Track listing

Commercial performance
The album debuted on the Top Country Albums chart at No. 3, and Billboard 200 at No. 28, selling 12,200 copies in the US for the week.

Charts

References

Television soundtracks
2015 soundtrack albums
Big Machine Records soundtracks
Country music soundtracks
Music of Nashville: Season 3, Volume 2